Eddy Le Huitouze (born 3 April 2003) is a French road and track cyclist, who currently rides for UCI Continental team .

Major results

Track
2020
 3rd  Omnium, UEC European Junior Championships
2021
 National Junior Championships
1st  Individual pursuit
1st  Team pursuit
 UEC European Junior Championships
2nd  Team pursuit
3rd  Omnium
 3rd Team pursuit, National Championships
2022
 1st Team pursuit, UCI Nations Cup, Glasgow
 3rd  Team pursuit, UEC European Under-23 Championships

Road
2020
 1st  Time trial, National Junior Championships
 8th Time trial, UEC European Junior Championships
2021
 3rd  Time trial, UEC European Junior Championships
 3rd Chrono des Nations Juniors
 5th Time trial, UCI World Junior Championships
2022
 1st  Time trial, National Under-23 Championships
 3rd  Time trial, UEC European Under-23 Championships
 7th Time trial, UCI World Under-23 Championships
 8th Chrono des Nations Under-23

References

External links

2003 births
Living people
French male cyclists
French track cyclists
Sportspeople from Lorient
21st-century French people